Borivoj G. Lazić (1 August 1939 – 4 April 2015) was a Serbian computer scientist and professor in the Faculty of Electrical Engineering at the  University of Belgrade. He is known for his involvement in the development of microprocessor systems and the CER Computer.

References

Serbian engineers
1939 births
2015 deaths
Serbian computer scientists